Le Champlain is the second ship of the  of cruise ships operated by Ponant.  Each member of the class has been allocated the name of a famous French explorer, and Le Champlain is named after Samuel de Champlain, "The Father of New France".

Built by VARD, Le Champlain had her hull constructed in VARD's Tulcea yard in Romania, where her keel was laid down on 20 April 2017.  A year and one week later, on 27 April 2018, she arrived at the builder's Søviknes facility in Ålesund, Norway, for final outfitting.  She was delivered to Ponant in Ålesund on 27 September 2018.

On 25 October 2018, Le Champlain departed from Honfleur, France on her maiden voyage to Lisbon, Portugal.

References

External links

 Compagnie du Ponant official site page about the ship

2018 ships
Ships built in Norway
Ships built in Romania
Ships of Compagnie du Ponant